The West Cheshire Association Football League (commonly known as the West Cheshire League) is an English football league in the county of Cheshire, which also includes teams from Merseyside. Its current principal sponsor is Carlsberg, also sponsor of the South West Peninsula League. It has a Division One, Division Two and Division Three. Division One sits at step 7 (or level 11) of the National League System.

If they have floodlights, the league's clubs are eligible for the FA Vase but not the FA Cup, and its champions are eligible for promotion to the North West Counties Football League Division One. After several triumphs in Division One, Cammell Laird was promoted to the North West Counties League in 2004, and its reserve team, which had won Division Two, was promoted to Division One. It was the only team since Vauxhall Motors to be promoted from the league, until Runcorn Town was promoted in 2010. In 2014, Vauxhall Motors returned to the league.

The league also runs cup competitions.

2022–23 member clubs

Division One

Aintree Villa 
Bootle St Edmund's
Capenhurst Villa 
Chester Nomads
Ellesmere Port Town
 Heswall
 Litherland REMYCA reserves
Maghull 
Marine U23s
Marshalls
Mersey Royal 
Mossley Hill Athletic 
Newton 
Prescot Cables reserves
Rainhill Town 
Vauxhall Motors reserves

Division Two

Ashville reserves
Bootle reserves
Cheshire Lines
Helsby
Maghull reserves
Mallaby
Marshalls reserves
Mossley Hill Athletic reserves
Poulton Royal
Poulton Victoria
Runcorn Sports
South Liverpool reserves
South Sefton Borough
Sutton Athletic
West Kirby

Division Three

Aintree Villa reserves
Capenhurst Villa reserves
Chester Nomads reserves
Ellesmere Port Town reserves
Groves Athletics
Helsby reserves
Heswall reserves
Higher Bebington Kelma
Hooton
Neston Nomads
Poulton Victoria reserves
Rainhill Town reserves
Runcorn Sports reserves
South Liverpool  thirds
West Kirby reserves

Divisional champions

1890s

1900s

1910s

1920s
No known league tables found although it is believed that the competition did operate in the period.

1930s
No known league tables found although it is believed that the competition did operate in the period.

1940s
All football competitions were suspended in for the seasons from 1940–41 to 1945–46 due to the Second World War.

1950s

1960s

1970s

1980s

1990s

2000s

2010s

2020s

Sources FA Full-Time,Non League Matters

References

External links

 F.A. Full Time website

 
1892 establishments in England
Football in Cheshire
Football leagues in England
Sports leagues established in 1892